Rustie Lee (born 22 May 1949) is a Jamaican television personality, television chef, actress and singer. She participated on the Channel 5 reality-television show Celebrity Super Spa in 2013; ITV's Who's Doing the Dishes?, hosted by Brian McFadden, in 2016; and Celebrity Coach Trip in 2020. Between 2015-2017 Rustie also appeared on childrens BBC TV programme Twirlywoos

Early life
She attended the girls' grammar school King Edward VI Handsworth School.

Broadcasting career
Lee first came to public attention for her appearances during the 1980s on the morning television station TV-am. Following her initial successful period as a chef on TV-am in 1983, Lee took over from Sarah Kennedy on the second incarnation of the ITV gameshow Game for a Laugh.

In 2004, Lee appeared on Livings I'm Famous and Frightened! 2, a reality show featuring a number of celebrities staying in a castle over a weekend, taking part in various challenges and looking for paranormal activity, guided by a medium. Viewers voted for their favourite star, and the celebrities were voted off one by one. Lee won the series showing a keen interest in the tasks and occasional emotional involvement, giving detailed and varied accounts of how she felt at certain points.

In recent years, she has made occasional appearances on This Morning, The Alan Titchmarsh Show and Daily Cooks/Saturday Cooks. She has also made appearances on That Antony Cotton Show, The Wright Stuff, Loose Women, and Channel 5's Big Brother's Bit on the Side, a spin-off chat show for Big Brother. She also appeared on the Channel 5 reality show Celebrity Super Spa.

Politics
In 2004, Lee joined the United Kingdom Independence Party (UKIP), and was adopted as their candidate for the Wyre Forest constituency in the 2005 general election. She also appeared in the party's election broadcast that year. On polling day, she came fifth, with 1,074 votes (2.3% of the total).

Lee stood for UKIP for the 2009 European Elections in the West Midlands constituency in June 2009, but was not elected.

General election contested

Other activities
Lee claimed in August 2018, on British breakfast television, that she "started Caribbean food".

Lee has written several cookbooks, including Rustie Lee's Caribbean Cookbook (1985) and A Taste of the Caribbean (2007).

In 2008, Lee briefly joined the cast of EastEnders as Gus Smith's aunt Opal Smith. She also appeared briefly in Peter Kay's Britain's Got the Pop Factor... and Possibly a New Celebrity Jesus Christ Soapstar Superstar Strictly on Ice. She appeared in the last episode of Benidorm Series 6 as Queenie. She also narrated children's stories for BBC Radio in Birmingham.

Lee has recorded as a singer. In 1985, she released the album Invitation to Party, including her cover versions of "Barbados" and "My Toot Toot". In 1994, she released a further single, "You'd Better Phone", paired with a B side cover of Don’t Stop (Wiggle Wiggle) by The Outhere Brothers  She also sang on a number of her appearances on Big Brother's Bit on the Side.

Lee has appeared in several pantomime productions including Jack and the Beanstalk, Aladdin, Snow White and the Seven Dwarfs and Peter Pan among others.

Filmography

References

External links
 

Black British actresses
Black British women politicians
Black British television personalities
British soap opera actresses
British television actresses
English people of Jamaican descent
Living people
People educated at King Edward VI Handsworth
People from Handsworth, West Midlands
Reality show winners
UK Independence Party parliamentary candidates
1949 births